El-Obeid (al-ʾAbyaḍ, lit."the White"), also romanized as Al-Ubayyid, is the capital of the state of North Kurdufan, in Sudan.

History and overview 
El-Obeid was founded by the pashas of Ottoman Egypt in 1821. It was attacked by the Mahdists in September 1882, and, after capitulation, was subsequently destroyed in 1883. It was then rebuilt on a modern plan in 1898, following the fall of the Mahdist empire.

In 2008, its population was 340,940. It is an important transportation hub: the terminus of a rail line, the junction of various national roads and camel caravan routes, and the end of a pilgrim route from Nigeria. As regional commercial centre, it is known for products such as gum arabic, millet, oilseeds, and livestock.

The population of El-Obeid today is majority Muslim, with a small Christian presence. The town is the site of an airport and an oil refinery. El-Obeid is home to the University of Kordofan, one of the largest universities in Sudan, established in 1990. Since 1989, the city also has been home to a French Association (Alliance française) that serves as a Sudanese-French cultural centre in cooperation with the university's French language department.

The United Nations Mission in Sudan established its Logistics Base there.

Due to the repair and paving of asphalt roads and the emergence of several private bus companies, transport became easier between the town and the Sudanese capital Khartoum. The  journey takes about nine hours by tourist coach, and another three hours from El-Obeid to Um Kadada in Darfur.

Climate

Sports
As of 2015, the Sudanese Premier League team Al-Hilal SC (Al-Ubayyid) plays in El-Obeid.

Religion
The town is predominantly Muslim. However, it is also the seat of a Roman Catholic Diocese, which is the only other one in Sudan next to Khartoum since the partition in 2011, and of an Anglican Bishopric.

The Catholic Cathedral of Our Lady Queen of Africa in El-Obeid is considered to be one of the largest and oldest churches in Sudan. It was founded in 1872 by Daniele Comboni, an Italian Roman Catholic bishop, who worked for the Catholic missions in Sudan between 1858 and his death in Khartoum in 1881. The present building was constructed between 1961 and 1964 in Italian style.

See also 

 Railway stations in Sudan
 Battle of El-Obeid

References 

 
Obeid
State capitals in Sudan